Main-Taunus is an electoral constituency (German: Wahlkreis) represented in the Bundestag. It elects one member via first-past-the-post voting. Under the current constituency numbering system, it is designated as constituency 181. It is located in southern Hesse, comprising the Main-Taunus-Kreis district and small parts of the Hochtaunuskreis district.

Main-Taunus was created for the 2002 federal election. Since 2017, it has been represented by Norbert Altenkamp of the Christian Democratic Union (CDU).

Geography
Main-Taunus is located in southern Hesse. As of the 2021 federal election, it comprises the entirety of the Main-Taunus-Kreis district as well as the municipalities of Königstein im Taunus, Kronberg im Taunus, and Steinbach (Taunus) from the Hochtaunuskreis district.

History
Main-Taunus was created in 2002. In the 2002 and 2005 elections, it was constituency 182 in the numbering system. Since the 2009 election, it has been number 181. Its borders have not changed since its creation.

Members
The constituency was first represented by Heinz Riesenhuber of the Christian Democratic Union (CDU) from 2002 to 2005 to 2017. Norbert Altenkamp of the CDU was elected in 2017.

Election results

2021 election

2017 election

2013 election

2009 election

References

Federal electoral districts in Hesse
2002 establishments in Germany
Constituencies established in 2002
Main-Taunus-Kreis
Hochtaunuskreis